Aloyzas Smilingis (pseudonym Elis; born 1 January 1938) is a Lithuanian sculptor and painter. He is known  for his large, monumental bronze and stone sculptures as well as abstract paintings. His artistic ideas often clashed with Soviet ideology,  and his sculptures that decorate numerous cities in Lithuania. He lives and works near Vilnius, Lithuania.

Biography
Smilingis was born in 1938, in the small Lithuanian town Plungė. His first formal art training was at 17 years old when he entered  Vilnius Institute of Art, without any prior artistic training.

After the collapse of the Soviet Union, Smilingis visited museums in New York, Amsterdam, and London. He met with famous artists including Willem de Kooning. 

In his seventies Elis mastered digital technology and started creating digital abstractions.

Artist resides and works in Lithuania. His art is owned by several Lithuanian museums, including Lithuanian Art Museum and Europos Parkas, and belongs to private collectors of Australia, Italy, United States, UK, Denmark, Netherlands, Germany, Sweden, Lithuania and Japan.

Awards
2007 Lithuanian Artists Association Award for Painting, Lithuania
1992 Prize at the International Sculpture Quadrennial Riga’92, Latvia
1984 First Medal at the Sculpture Quadrennial, Riga, Latvia
1980 Prize at the Sculpture Quadrennial, Riga, Latvia

Public art
1992 Holocaust Memorial in Alytus, Lithuania
1984 Outdoor sculpture, Panevėžys city park, Lithuania
1979 Outdoor sculpture, Klaipėda Sculpture Park, Lithuania
1977 Mural, hotel in the Northern Caucasus, Russia

References 

1938 births
People from Plungė
Artists from Vilnius
20th-century Lithuanian painters
21st-century Lithuanian sculptors
21st-century male artists
20th-century Lithuanian sculptors
Male sculptors
20th-century male artists
Living people
Vilnius Academy of Arts alumni
Abstract painters